ι Phoenicis, Latinized as Iota Phoenicis, is a binary star system in the southern constellation of Phoenix, near the constellation border with Grus. It is visible to the naked eye as a faint, white-hued star with an apparent visual magnitude that fluctuates around 4.71. This system lies approximately 254 light years from the Sun based on parallax, and it is drifting further away with a radial velocity of +19.4 km/s.

The primary component is an Ap star on the main sequence with a stellar classification of A2VpSrCrEu, where the suffix notation indicates abnormal abundances of strontium, chromium, and europium in the stellar atmosphere. It is an Alpha2 Canum Venaticorum variable; its apparent magnitude varies from 4.70 down to 4.75 with a period of 12.5 days.

References

A-type main-sequence stars
Alpha2 Canum Venaticorum variables
Ap stars
Binary stars

Phoenix (constellation)
Phoenicis, Iota
Durchmusterung objects
221760
116389
8949